The Tebaldi-Zari was an Italian fighter prototype of 1919. The Breda company later acquired the rights to it.

Design and development
An engineer named Tebaldi designed the Tebaldi-Zari, which was a single-seat wooden sesquiplane with heavily staggered wings and a  Isotta Fraschini V.6, water-cooled 6-cylinder in-line engine, driving a two-bladed tractor propeller. Its fixed, tailskid landing gear was of very unusual configuration; the main gear was of very wide track and had oversized main wheels with their axle incorporated into the lower wing.

The Zari brothers' factory in Bovisio Mombello, Milan, manufactured the Tebaldi-Zari prototype in 1919, but Breda soon bought both the prototype and the design rights to the aircraft from Zari. Breda re-engined the prototype with a  Hispano-Suiza HS-42 V-8 water-cooled engine. In 1922 and drafted an agreement with the Italian government to produce three more aircraft, but no production order followed.

Undaunted, Breda modified the original prototype by arming it with two fixed, forward-firing  Vickers machine-guns, modifying its upper wing so that it had a longer span and narrower chord, reducing the wing stagger, increasing the gap between the upper wing and fuselage, and increasing the angle of the outer struts so that they attached to the axle of the main wheels allowing the outer wing panels to be removed whenever a desire existed to test the Tebaldi-Zari as a sesquiplane. After these modifications were complete, Breda set about another redesign of the aircraft, this time increasing the size of the ailerons and the chord of the upper wing and removing the outer panels of the lower wing permanently.

Thus modified, the original Tebaldi-Zari prototype was entered in the Italian 1923 fighter contest. The Regia Aeronautica (Italian Royal Air Force) took no interest in a production order, and no further aircraft were built.

Operators

Specifications (with HS-42 engine)

See also

References

Tebaldi-Zari
1910s Italian fighter aircraft
Sesquiplanes
Single-engined tractor aircraft
Aircraft first flown in 1919
Biplanes with negative stagger